East Timor is divided into 14 municipalities (former districts), one of which is also a Special Administrative Region. The municipalities are divided into administrative posts (former subdistricts), and further subdivided into sucos (villages). Atauro Island was initially part of Dili Municipality, but became a separate municipality on 1 January 2022.

The borders between Cova Lima and Ainaro and between Baucau and Viqueque were changed in 2003.

See also 
List of municipalities of East Timor by Human Development Index
Administrative posts of East Timor
 Sucos of East Timor
 Administrative divisions of Timor Timur Province
 ISO 3166-2:TL

References

External links

  – official site 
  – information page on Ministry of State Administration site 

 
East Timor, Municipalities
East Timor 1
Municipalities, East Timor
East Timor geography-related lists

de:Liste der Verwaltungseinheiten Osttimors